A perovskite is any material with a crystal structure following the formula ABX3, which was first discovered as the mineral called perovskite, which consists of calcium titanium oxide (CaTiO3). The mineral was first discovered in the Ural mountains of Russia by Gustav Rose in 1839 and named after Russian mineralogist L. A. Perovski (1792–1856). 'A' and 'B' are two positively charged ions (i.e. cations), often of very different sizes, and X is a negatively charged ion (an anion, frequently oxide) that bonds to both cations. The 'A' atoms are generally larger than the 'B' atoms. The ideal cubic structure has the B cation in 6-fold coordination, surrounded by an octahedron of anions, and the A cation in 12-fold cuboctahedral coordination. Additional perovskite forms may exist where either/both the A and B sites have a configuration of A1x-1A2x and/or B1y-1B2y and the X may deviate from the ideal coordination configuration as ions within the A and B sites undergo changes in their oxidation states.

As one of the most abundant structural families, perovskites are found in an enormous number of compounds which have wide-ranging properties, applications and importance. Natural compounds with this structure are perovskite, loparite, and the silicate perovskite bridgmanite. Since the 2009 discovery of perovskite solar cells, which contain methylammonium lead halide perovskites, there has been considerable research interest into perovskite materials.

Structure
Perovskite structures are adopted by many oxides that have the chemical formula ABO3. The idealized form is a cubic structure (space group Pmm, no. 221) which is rarely encountered. The orthorhombic (e.g. space group Pnma, no. 62, or Amm2, no. 68) and tetragonal (e.g. space group I4/mcm, no. 140, or P4mm, no. 99) phases are the most common non-cubic variants. Although the perovskite structure is named after CaTiO3, this mineral forms a non-idealized form. SrTiO3 and CaRbF3 are examples of cubic perovskites. Barium titanate is an example of a perovskite which can take on the rhombohedral (space group R3m, no. 160), orthorhombic, tetragonal and cubic forms depending on temperature.

In the idealized cubic unit cell of such a compound, the type 'A' atom sits at cube corner position (0, 0, 0), the type 'B' atom sits at the body-center position (1/2, 1/2, 1/2) and oxygen atoms sit at face centered positions (1/2, 1/2, 0), (1/2, 0, 1/2) and (0, 1/2, 1/2). The diagram to the right shows edges for an equivalent unit cell with A in the cube corner position, B at the body center, and O at face-centered positions.

Four general categories of cation-pairing are possible: A+B2+X−3, or 1:2 perovskites; A2+B4+X2−3, or 2:4 perovskites; A3+B3+X2−3, or 3:3 perovskites; and A+B5+X2−3, or 1:5 perovskites.

The relative ion size requirements for stability of the cubic structure are quite stringent, so slight buckling and distortion can produce several lower-symmetry distorted versions, in which the coordination numbers of A cations, B cations or both are reduced. Tilting of the BO6 octahedra reduces the coordination of an undersized A cation from 12 to as low as 8. Conversely, off-centering of an undersized B cation within its octahedron allows it to attain a stable bonding pattern. The resulting electric dipole is responsible for the property of ferroelectricity and  shown by perovskites such as BaTiO3 that distort in this fashion.

Complex perovskite structures contain two different B-site cations. This results in the possibility of ordered and disordered variants.

Layered perovskites 

Perovskites may be structured in layers, with the  structure separated by thin sheets of intrusive material. Different forms of intrusions, based on the chemical makeup of the intrusion, are defined as:
 Aurivillius phase: the intruding layer is composed of a []2+ ion, occurring every n  layers, leading to an overall chemical formula of []-. Their oxide ion-conducting properties were first discovered in the 1970s by Takahashi et al., and they have been used for this purpose ever since.
 Dion−Jacobson phase: the intruding layer is composed of an alkali metal (M) every n  layers, giving the overall formula as 
 Ruddlesden-Popper phase: the simplest of the phases, the intruding layer occurs between every one (n = 1) or multiple (n > 1) layers of the  lattice. Ruddlesden−Popper phases have a similar relationship to perovskites in terms of atomic radii of elements with A typically being large (such as La or Sr) with the B ion being much smaller typically a transition metal (such as Mn, Co or Ni). Recently, hybrid organic-inorganic layered perovskites have been developed, where the structure is constituted of one or more layers of MX64--octahedra, where M is a +2 metal (such as Pb2+ or Sn2+) and X and halide ion (such as ), separated by layers of organic cations (such as butylammonium- or phenylethylammonium-cation).

Thin films

Perovskites can be deposited as epitaxial thin films on top of other perovskites, using techniques such as pulsed laser deposition and molecular-beam epitaxy. These films can be a couple of nanometres thick or as small as a single unit cell. The well-defined and unique structures at the interfaces between the film and substrate can be used for interface engineering, where new types properties can arise. This can happen through several mechanisms, from mismatch strain between the substrate and film, change in the oxygen octahedral rotation, compositional changes, and quantum confinement. An example of this is LaAlO3 grown on SrTiO3, where the interface can exhibit conductivity, even though both LaAlO3 and SrTiO3 are non-conductive. Another example is SrTiO3 grown on LSAT ((LaAlO3)0.3 (Sr2AlTaO6)0.7) or DyScO3 can morph the incipient ferroelectric into a ferroelectric at room temperature through the means of epitaxially applied biaxial strain. The lattice mismatch of GdScO3 to SrTiO3 (+1.0 %) applies tensile stress resulting in a decrease of the out-of-plane lattice constant of SrTiO3, compared to  LSAT (–0.9 %), which epitaxially applies compressive stress leading to an extension of the out-of-plane lattice constant of SrTiO3 (and subsequent increase of the in-plane lattice constant).

Octahedral tilting 
Beyond the most common perovskite symmetries (cubic, tetragonal, orthorhombic), a more precise determination leads to a total of 23 different structure types that can be found. These 23 structure can be categorized into 4 different so-called tilt systems that are denoted by their respective Glazer notation.

The notation consists of a letter a/b/c, which describes the rotation around a Cartesian axis and a superscript +/—/0 to denote the rotation with respect to the adjacent layer. A “+” denotes that the rotation of two adjacent layers points in the same direction, whereas a “—” denotes that adjacent layers are rotated in opposite directions. Common examples are a0a0a0, a0a0a– and a0a0a+ which are visualized here.

Examples

Minerals 
The perovskite structure is adopted at high pressure by bridgmanite, a silicate with the chemical formula , which is the most common mineral in the Earth's mantle. As pressure increases, the SiO44− tetrahedral units in the dominant silica-bearing minerals become unstable compared with SiO68− octahedral units. At the pressure and temperature conditions of the lower mantle, the second most abundant material is likely the rocksalt-structured  oxide, periclase.

At the high pressure conditions of the Earth's lower mantle, the pyroxene enstatite, MgSiO3, transforms into a denser perovskite-structured polymorph; this phase may be the most common mineral in the Earth. This phase has the orthorhombically distorted perovskite structure (GdFeO3-type structure) that is stable at pressures from ~24 GPa to ~110 GPa. However, it cannot be transported from depths of several hundred km to the Earth's surface without transforming back into less dense materials. At higher pressures, MgSiO3 perovskite, commonly known as silicate perovskite, transforms to post-perovskite.

Complex perovskites 
Although there is a large number of simple known ABX3 perovskites, this number can be greatly expanded if the A and B sites are increasingly doubled / complex AA’BB’X6. Ordered double perovskites are usually denoted as A2BB’O6 where disordered are denoted as A(BB’)O3. In ordered perovskites, three different types of ordering are possible: rock-salt, layered, and columnar. The most common ordering is rock-salt followed by the much more uncommon disordered and very distant columnar and layered. The formation of rock-salt superstructures is dependent on the B-site cation ordering. Octahedral tilting can occur in double perovskites, however Jahn–Teller distortions and alternative modes alter the B–O bond length.

Others 
Although the most common perovskite compounds contain oxygen, there are a few perovskite compounds that form without oxygen. Fluoride perovskites such as NaMgF3 are well known. A large family of metallic perovskite compounds can be represented by RT3M (R: rare-earth or other relatively large ion, T: transition metal ion and M: light metalloids). The metalloids occupy the octahedrally coordinated "B" sites in these compounds. RPd3B, RRh3B and  CeRu3C are examples. MgCNi3 is a metallic perovskite compound and has received lot of attention because of its superconducting properties. An even more exotic type of perovskite is represented by the mixed oxide-aurides of Cs and Rb,  such as Cs3AuO, which contain large alkali cations in the traditional "anion" sites, bonded to O2− and Au− anions.

Materials properties

Perovskite materials exhibit many interesting and intriguing properties from both the theoretical and the application point of view. Colossal magnetoresistance, ferroelectricity, superconductivity, charge ordering, spin dependent transport, high thermopower and the interplay of structural, magnetic and transport properties are commonly observed features in this family. These compounds are used as sensors and catalyst electrodes in certain types of fuel cells  and are candidates for memory devices and spintronics applications.

Many superconducting ceramic materials (the high temperature superconductors) have perovskite-like structures, often with 3 or more metals including copper, and some oxygen positions left vacant. One prime example is yttrium barium copper oxide which can be insulating or superconducting depending on the oxygen content.

Chemical engineers are considering a cobalt-based perovskite material as a replacement for platinum in catalytic converters for diesel vehicles.

Applications 

Physical properties of interest to materials science among perovskites include superconductivity, magnetoresistance, ionic conductivity, and a multitude of dielectric properties, which are of great importance in microelectronics and telecommunication. They are also some interests for scintillator as they have large light yield for radiation conversion. Because of the flexibility of bond angles inherent in the perovskite structure there are many different types of distortions which can occur from the ideal structure. These include tilting of the octahedra, displacements of the cations out of the centers of their coordination polyhedra, and distortions of the octahedra driven by electronic factors (Jahn-Teller distortions). The financially biggest application of perovskites is in ceramic capacitors, in which BaTiO3 is used because of its high dielectric constant.

Photovoltaics 

Synthetic perovskites have been identified as possible inexpensive base materials for high-efficiency commercial photovoltaics – they showed a conversion efficiency of up to 26.3% reported in 2022 by Northwestern University and can be manufactured using the same thin-film manufacturing techniques as that used for thin film silicon solar cells. Methylammonium tin halides and methylammonium lead halides are of interest for use in dye-sensitized solar cells.  In July 2016, a team of researchers led by Dr. Alexander Weber-Bargioni demonstrated that perovskite PV cells could reach a theoretical peak efficiency of 31%.

Among the methylammonium halides studied so far the most common is the methylammonium lead triiodide. It has a high charge carrier mobility and charge carrier lifetime that allow light-generated electrons and holes to move far enough to be extracted as current, instead of losing their energy as heat within the cell.  effective diffusion lengths are some 100 nm for both electrons and holes.

Methylammonium halides are deposited by low-temperature solution methods (typically spin-coating). Other low-temperature (below 100 °C) solution-processed films tend to have considerably smaller diffusion lengths. Stranks et al. described nanostructured cells using a mixed methylammonium lead halide and demonstrated one amorphous thin-film solar cell with an 11.4% conversion efficiency, and another that reached 15.4% using vacuum evaporation. The film thickness of about 500 to 600 nm implies that the electron and hole diffusion lengths were at least of this order. They measured values of the diffusion length exceeding 1 μm for the mixed perovskite, an order of magnitude greater than the 100 nm for the pure iodide. They also showed that carrier lifetimes in the mixed perovskite are longer than in the pure iodide. Liu et al. applied Scanning Photo-current Microscopy to show that the electron diffusion length in mixed halide perovskite along (110) plane is in the order of 10 μm.

Because the band gaps (Eg) of both are 1.55 eV, VOC-to-Eg ratios are higher than usually observed for similar third-generation cells. With wider bandgap perovskites, VOC up to 1.3 V has been demonstrated.

The technique offers the potential of low cost because of the low temperature solution methods and the absence of rare elements. Cell durability is currently insufficient for commercial use.

Planar heterojunction perovskite solar cells can be manufactured in simplified device architectures (without complex nanostructures) using only vapor deposition.  This technique produces 15% solar-to-electrical power conversion as measured under simulated full sunlight.

Lasers 

In 2008, researchers demonstrated that perovskite can generate laser light. LaAlO3 doped with neodymium gave laser emission at 1080 nm.  In 2014 it was shown that mixed methylammonium lead halide cells fashioned into optically pumped vertical-cavity surface-emitting lasers (VCSELs) convert visible pump light to near-IR laser light with a 70% efficiency.

Light-emitting diodes 
Due to their high photoluminescence quantum efficiencies, perovskites may be good candidates for use in light-emitting diodes (LEDs). Although the stability of perovskite LEDs is not yet as good as III-V or organic LEDs, there are plenty of ongoing research to solve this problem, such as incorporating organic molecules or potassium dopants in perovskite LEDs.

Photoelectrolysis 

In September 2014, researchers at EPFL in Lausanne, Switzerland, reported achieving water electrolysis at 12.3% efficiency in a highly efficient and low-cost water-splitting cell using perovskite photovoltaics.

Scintillators 

In 1997, scintillation properties of cerium doped lutetium aluminum perovskite (LuAP:Ce) single crystals were reported. The main property of those crystals is a large mass density of 8.4 g/cm3, which gives short X- and gamma-ray absorption length. The scintillation light yield and the decay time with Cs137 radiation source are 11,400 photons/MeV and 17 ns, respectively. Those properties made LUAP:Ce scintillators attractive for commercials and they were used quite often in high energy physics experiments. Until eleven years later, one group in Japan proposed Ruddlesden-Popper solution-based hybrid organic-inorganic perovskite crystals as low-cost scintillators. However, the properties were not so impressive in comparison with LuAP:Ce. Until the next nine years, the solution-based hybrid organic-inorganic perovskite crystals became popular again through a report about their high light yields of more than 100,000 photons/MeV at cryogenic temperatures. Recent demonstration of perovskite nanocrystal scintillators for X-ray imaging screen was reported and it is triggering more research efforts for perovskite scintillators. Layered Ruddlesden-Popper perovskites have shown potential as fast novel scintillators with room temperature light yields up to 40,000 photons/MeV, fast decay times below 5 ns and negligible afterglow. In addition this class of materials have shown capability for wide-range particle detection, including alpha particles and thermal neutrons.

Examples of perovskites
Simple:
 Strontium titanate
 Calcium titanate
 Lead titanate
 Bismuth ferrite
 Lanthanum ytterbium oxide
 Silicate perovskite
 Lanthanum manganite
 Yttrium aluminum perovskite (YAP)
 Lutetium aluminum perovskite (LuAP)

Solid solutions:
 Lanthanum strontium manganite
 LSAT (lanthanum aluminate – strontium aluminum tantalate)
 Lead scandium tantalate
 Lead zirconate titanate
 Methylammonium lead halide
 Methylammonium tin halide
 Formamidinium tin halide

See also
 Antiperovskite
 Aurivillius phases
 Diamond anvil
 Goldschmidt tolerance factor
 Ruddlesden-Popper phase
 Spinel

References

Further reading

External links
  (includes a Java applet with which the structure can be interactively rotated)
 Перовскит в Каталоге Минералов

Mineralogy
Solar power

Crystal structure types
Crystallography

de:Perowskit#Kristallstruktur